The men's 400 metre individual medley competition of the swimming events at the 2015 Pan American Games took place on July 16 at the CIBC Pan Am/Parapan Am Aquatics Centre and Field House in Toronto, Canada. The defending Pan American Games champion was Thiago Pereira of Brazil.

This race consisted of eight lengths of the pool. The first two lengths were swum using the butterfly stroke, the second pair with the backstroke, the third pair of lengths in breaststroke, and the final two were freestyle. The top eight swimmers from the heats would qualify for the A final (where the medals would be awarded), while the next best eight swimmers would qualify for the B final.

Records
Prior to this competition, the existing world and Pan American Games records were as follows:

Qualification

Each National Olympic Committee (NOC) was able to enter up to two entrants providing they had met the A standard (4:35.99) in the qualifying period (January 1, 2014 to May 1, 2015). NOCs were also permitted to enter one athlete providing they had met the B standard (4:52.55) in the same qualifying period. All other competing athletes were entered as universality spots.

Schedule
All times are Eastern Time Zone (UTC-4).

Results

Heats
The first round was held on July 16.

B Final 
The B final was also held on July 16.

A Final 
The A final was also held on July 16. Thiago Pereira initially won, which would make it his third consecutive title along with a record 22nd Pan American medal. However, the judges dictated Pereira failed to touch the wall with both hands at the same time on one of his breaststroke turns as predicted by the rulebook.

References

Swimming at the 2015 Pan American Games